The Wallaman Falls, a cascade and horsetail waterfall on the Stony Creek, is located in the UNESCO World Heritagelisted Wet Tropics in the locality of Wallaman, Shire of Hinchinbrook in the northern region of Queensland, Australia. An estimated  people visit the waterfall annually.

Location and features
The waterfall is situated in the Girringun National Park as it descends from the Atherton Tableland, where the Stony Creek, a tributary of the Herbert River, flows over an escarpment in the Seaview Range. The falls initially descend over a small number of cascades before the  horsetail drop. Based on the falls' single-drop descent, the World Waterfall Database places Wallaman Falls at 294 in its world rankings.

The geological history of the formation may be traced back some 50 million years, when the uplift of the continental margin in the region created modern landforms. The Herbert River, which previously flowed west, began to cut through the terrain en route to its outflow in the Coral Sea. The river's tributaries were eventually left suspended by this action, forming their own gorges.

See also

 List of waterfalls of Queensland

References

External links

 Wallaman Falls website by the Queensland Government
 Wallaman Falls at the World Waterfall Database
 

Waterfalls of Queensland
North Queensland
Plunge waterfalls